Umiat Airport  is a state owned, public use airport located in Umiat, in the North Slope Borough of the U.S. state of Alaska.  The original runway was created by Seabees of Construction Battalion Detachment 1058 in 1945.  They built it to facilitate the resupply of their drilling operation at Umiat.

As per the Federal Aviation Administration, this airport had 197 passenger boardings (enplanements) in calendar year 2008, 569 in 2009, and 107 in 2010.

Facilities and aircraft 
Umiat Airport covers an area of 290 acres (117 ha) at an elevation of 267 feet (81 m) above mean sea level. It has one runway designated 6/24 with a gravel surface measuring 5,583 by 100 feet (1,702 x 30 m).    For the 12-month period ending January 1, 2006, the airport had 200 aircraft operations, an average of 16 per month: 50% air taxi and 50% general aviation.

Statistics

See also 
 List of airports in Alaska

References

External links 
 FAA Alaska airport diagram (GIF)
 Topographic map from USGS The National Map

Airports in North Slope Borough, Alaska